This is a list of characters from the BBC soap opera EastEnders, ordered by the year in which they made their final appearance. For a full list of present characters, see list of characters from EastEnders.



2020s

Last appeared in 2023

Last appeared in 2022

Last appeared in 2021

Last appeared in 2020

2010s

Last appeared in 2019

Last appeared in 2018

Last appeared in 2017

Last appeared in 2016

Last appeared in 2015

Last appeared in 2014

Last appeared in 2013

Last appeared in 2012

Last appeared in 2011

Last appeared in 2010

2000s

Last appeared in 2009

Last appeared in 2008

Last appeared in 2007

Last appeared in 2006

Last appeared in 2005

Last appeared in 2004

Last appeared in 2003

Last appeared in 2002

Last appeared in 2001

Last appeared in 2000

1990s

Last appeared in 1999

Last appeared in 1998

Last appeared in 1997

Last appeared in 1996

Last appeared in 1995

Last appeared in 1994

Last appeared in 1993

Last appeared in 1992

Last appeared in 1991

Last appeared in 1990

1980s

Last appeared in 1989

Last appeared in 1988

Last appeared in 1987

Last appeared in 1986

Last appeared in 1985

References

External links
 
 Cast and characters on IMDb

EastEnders